Henri Lapeyre (1910-1984) was a French historian and Hispanist, specialist in the modern history of Spain. He was professor of modern history at the University of Grenoble.

Selected works 

 Une Famille de marchands : Les Ruiz. Contribution a l'étude du commerce entre la France et l'Espagne au temps de Philippe II Éditions de l'École des Hautes Études en Sciences ISBN 2-7132-0480-1 edición original 1955 
 Simon Ruiz et Les asientos De Philippe II ed. Ehess 
 Simón Ruiz en Medina del Campo. 1525-1597.Cámara de Comercio e Industria de Valladolid, 1990, Valladolid. 
 La Taula de Cambis (en la vida económica de Valencia a mediados del reinado de Felipe II) 1982 
 El comercio exterior de Castilla a través de las aduanas de Felipe II (Estudios y documentos)1981 Universidad de Valladolid, Facultad de Filosofía y Letras 
 Ensayos de historiografía 1978 Facultad de Filosofía y Letras, Universidad de Valladolid  
 La Trata de negros con destino a la América Española Durante Los últimos años del reinado de Carlos V. 1544-1555 Separata del Cuaderno de Investigación Histórica. Madrid, 1978 
 Carlos Quinto Col. ¿Qué sé? N.º 65 Ediciones Oikos-tau (1972) 
 Las monarquías europeas del siglo XVI : las relaciones internacionales Barcelona, España : Labor, 1969 
 Géographie de l'Espagne morisque 1959​

References 

French Hispanists
1910 births
1984 deaths
French male non-fiction writers
20th-century French historians